XLRI – Xavier School of Management (XLRI or formerly Xavier Labour Relations Institute) is a private business school run by the Society of Jesus (Jesuits) in Jamshedpur, Jharkhand, India. It was founded in 1949 in the steel city of Jamshedpur, as the oldest business school in India. In 2020, the same society has started a new campus in Jhajjar, Delhi.

The institute is a signatory of PRME – Principles for Responsible Management Education. It takes up several social initiatives round the year and focuses on sustainability. The campus plans to go carbon neutral by 2020.

History

XLRI began by offering courses in management and trade unions in 1949 before setting up a two-year, full-time program in industrial welfare in 1953.

Academics 
XLRI offers two-year Diploma in Management programmes – Postgraduate Diploma in Business Management (PGDBM) and Postgraduate Diploma in Human Resource Management (PGDHRM). It also offers a 15-month full-time residential PGDM in General Management Program known as PGDM (GM)(formerly known as GMP), a three-year Postgraduate Diploma in Business Management (PGDBM), three-year)  for working executives and a Fellowship Diploma in Management (FDPM). XLRI is also known for offering various short-term management development programmes and a host of virtual programs.

Rankings

XLRI was ranked eight among management schools in India by the National Institutional Ranking Framework (NIRF) in 2021.
It was ranked first in Outlook Indias "Top Private MBA Institutes" of 2020.

Notable people

Alumni 
XLRI, being the oldest B-school in India, has over 30,000 alumni.

Academics 
 Hayagreeva Rao, 1980 – Atholl McBean Professor of Organizational Behavior and Human Resources at the Stanford Graduate School of Business, United States
 Satish Nambisan, 1989 – Nancy and Joseph Keithley Professor of Technology Management at the Weatherhead School of Management, Case Western Reserve University, Cleveland, United States

Arts and social work 
 Akash Khurana, 1977 – actor
 Ananth Vaidyanathan – actor, playback singer and singing trainer
 Mahesh Mahadevan, 1978 – composer
 Mohan Raman, 1978 – actor

Business 
 Arjun Shekhar, 1990 – founder of Vyaktitva
 B Muthuraman, 1966 – Vice-Chairman, Tata Steel
 Krishnakumar Natarajan, 1981 – Chairman and co-founder, Mindtree
 Leena Nair, 1992 – Chief Executive Officer, Chanel
 Naveen Jain, 1982 – founder of Infospace and Moon Express
 Prakash Puram, 1978 – former President and CEO of 
 Rakesh Kapoor, 1987 – CEO, Reckitt Benckiser
 Sandeep Bakhshi, 1983 – CEO and MD, ICICI Bank
 Sandip Sen, 1989 – Global CEO and ED of Aegis Ltd
 Srinivas Kandula – Chairman Capgemini, India
 Vineet Nayar 1985 – former CEO, HCL Technologies

Government and politics 
 Abhishek Singh, 2006 – former Member of Parliament, Lok Sabha for Rajnandgaon
 Arun Maira, 1963 – former member of Planning Commission of India and former Chairman of Boston Consulting Group, India
 K. Pandiarajan, 1984 – former Minister for Tamil language, Tamil Culture and Archaeology, Government of Tamil Nadu
 Prerana Issar, 1997 – Chief People Officer at National Health Service, UK
 Sanjay Jha, 1986 – National Spokesperson for Congress

Literature 
 Abhijit Bhaduri, 1984 – author, columnist and Chief Learning Officer, Wipro
 Gautam Sen, 1984 – author, journalist and automotive design consultant
 Shantanu Gupta, 2005 – author and political analyst

Sports 
 Sanjeeva Kumar Singh, 2000 – Indian archery coach, Arjuna Award and Dronacharya Award winner

Faculty and Staff 
 T V Rao – Chairman of T V Rao Learning Systems Pvt. Ltd. and referred to as 'Father of HRD' in India

See also
 List of Jesuit sites

References

External links
 

 
All India Council for Technical Education
1949 establishments in India
Business schools in Jharkhand
Educational institutions established in 1949
Universities and colleges in Jharkhand